The Padsan River, also called as Laoag River or Sarrat River is the largest river in Ilocos Norte in the island of Luzon in the Philippines. It is notable because its main channel bisects the central townships of the Municipalities of Dingras and Sarrat, as well as that of the Component City of Laoag, which is the capital of Ilocos Norte.

As a result, its waters have shaped the history and culture of these historic towns, and of the province of Ilocos Norte. It is the site of the Madongan Dam  in Dingras, and is right beside the Laoag International Airport in Laoag.

References 

Rivers of the Philippines